Vicki Hall (born October 3, 1969) is an assistant coach with the Indiana Fever since 2021. Before joining the WNBA team, Hall served as the head coach of the Indiana State Sycamores women's basketball team from 2018 to 2021. As a basketball player, Hall was the 1988 Naismith Prep Player of the Year and Gatorade High School Basketball Player of the Year after accumulating 1,755 points with Brebeuf High School. With the Texas Longhorns women's basketball team from 1988 to 1993, Hall reached the final eight of the NCAA Division I women's basketball tournament between 1989 and 1990 and had 1,831 career points. Apart from college basketball, Hall won gold at the 1990 FIBA World Championship for Women and the 1990 Goodwill Games with the American women basketball team.

For her professional basketball career in the United States, Hall played in the American Basketball League during the late 1990s before joining the Women's National Basketball Association in 2000. With the Cleveland Rockers, Indiana Fever and the Los Angeles Sparks, Hall played in a combined total of 61 games up to 2002 and had 255 points. For her international career, Hall had 1,958 points for several Italian teams in the Lega Basket Femminile during the 2000s. In between her stints with Italy, Hall had 155 points in the 2006–07 EuroLeague Women for France. Other countries that Hall played basketball in include Greece, Israel and Turkey. Hall was inducted into the Indiana Basketball Hall of Fame in 2013.

Early life and education
On October 3, 1969, Hall was born in Indianapolis, Indiana. During her childhood, Hall began playing basketball by herself as a toddler. In elementary school, Hall was on a basketball team while participating in athletics and softball. As a teenager, Hall played at the 1984 AAU Junior Olympic Games in the girls basketball event.

At Brebeuf High School during the 1980s, Hall accumulated 1,755 points and 907 rebounds during her 87 games. In 1988, Hall was named Indiana Miss Basketball. That year, she was also the recipient of the Naismith Prep Player of the Year Award and Gatorade High School Basketball Player of the Year Award. During this time period, Hall won silver at the 1986 U.S. Olympic Festival and gold at the 1987 William Jones Cup. In 1988, she won another gold medal at the FIBA Americas Under-18 Championship for Women.

Between 1988 and 1993, Hall was on the Texas Longhorns women's basketball team while attending the University of Texas at Austin. While with Texas, Hall had 887 rebounds and scored 1831 points during her 117 games. She also was part of the Longhorns roster that made it to the final eight at the 1989 NCAA Division I women's basketball tournament and 1990 NCAA Division I women's basketball tournament. In records from 1990 to 1993, Hall had the most points in two seasons and most rebounds in three seasons. In 2022, Hall was in the top ten for multiple career records. These included  6th-place positions for most defensive rebounds and most points.

Apart from college basketball, Hall was on the American team that played at the 1989 FIBA Americas Championship for Women. She also won gold with the American women's basketball team at the 1990 FIBA World Championship for Women and the 1990 Goodwill Games. For her post-secondary education, Hall studied psychology at Texas and graduated in 1993 with a bachelor's degree.

Career

Professional career
As a European basketball player between 1993 and 1996, Hall started out in Switzerland before she primarily played for Greece. In 1996, Hall remained in Greece after declining to be drafted by the Colorado Xplosion. The following year, Hall left Greece to play for the Xplosion in the American Basketball League. In 1998, Hall stayed in the ABL when she was drafted by the Nashville Noise. After Hall played with the Noise until the ABL closed in December 1998, she resumed her Greek basketball career in 1999.

In the Women's National Basketball Association, Hall started her first games with the Cleveland Rockers between May to June 2000. After experiencing a back injury in July 2001, Hall was released by the Rockers and started playing for the Indiana Fever that month. In May 2002, Hall played for the Los Angeles Sparks during their preseason. After 3 games with the Sparks, Hall ended her WNBA career with 255 points, 140 rebounds and 61 games during her time with the three teams.

Outside of the WNBA, Hall played basketball in Israel and Turkey during the early 2000s. From 2003 to 2006, Hall played on various Italian teams in the Lega Basket Femminile. While in Italy, Hall and her team were part of the final four in 2006. Hall went to France for the 2006–07 EuroLeague Women season where she had 77 rebounds and 155 points. Hall returned to the Lega Basket Femminile in 2007 and remained with the league until 2008. With the LBF, Hall scored 1,958 overall points between four teams.

Coaching career
Between 2002 and 2003, Hall coached in Israel as the interim women's basketball head coach for Bank Leumi. After ending her playing career in 2009, Hall became an assistant coach for Miami University in Oxford, Ohio. She remained at Miami until she continued her assistant coaching career with the University of New Mexico's women's basketball team in 2011. After transferring to the University of Toledo in 2012, Hall worked as an associate head coach for their women's basketball team from 2012 to 2017. In March 2018, Hall became the head coach of the Indiana State Sycamores women's basketball team. In her first two seasons with the NCAA Division I team, Hall had 16 wins and 44 losses. After leaving Indiana State in March 2021 following her third season as head coach, Hall had 21 wins and 59 losses. The following month, Hall was hired by the Indiana Fever as an assistant coach.

Honors
In 1990, Hall was in the top ten for the most points scored by a girls basketball player in Indiana. That year, Hall was named Most Valuable Player on the women's basketball team for the University of Texas. In 2013, Hall was named to the Silver Anniversary Team by the Indiana Basketball Hall of Fame. Years later, she was inducted into the Indiana Basketball Hall of Fame in 2015. In 2018, Hall was inducted into the University of Texas at Austin Hall of Honor.

References

External links

1969 births
Texas Longhorns women's basketball players
Colorado Xplosion players
Nashville Noise players
Cleveland Rockers players
Indiana Fever players
Los Angeles Sparks players
Indiana State Sycamores women's basketball coaches
Living people
Competitors at the 1990 Goodwill Games
Indiana Fever coaches